The Agency for Quality Assurance through Accreditation of Study Programs (AQAS) is an independent non-profit organisation dedicated for the accreditation of higher education institutions in Germany. It is supported by more than 80 member institutions, both higher education institutions as well as academic associations. AQAS was founded in 2002 and is headquartered in Cologne, North Rhine-Westphalia, Germany. To date it has accredited more than 3,500 degree programs at universities and universities of applied sciences, including numerous programs outside of Germany. In January 2009, the German Accreditation Council granted permission to AQAS to accredit quality assurance systems of higher education institutions as well.

The agency is member in various international education networks: The European University Association, the European Consortium for Accreditation, the European Network for Quality Assurance, and the European Quality Assurance Register for Higher Education.

Accredited institutions 
Currently, AQAS has accredited around 80 higher education institutions from several countries including Germany, Austria, Chile, China, Switzerland, Ghana, Indonesia, and the United Kingdom, among them:

 HTW Berlin
 Paris-Sorbonne University
 San Sebastián University
 State University of Surabaya
 Tongji University
 University of Cologne
 University of Florence
 University of Ghana
 University of Graz
 University of Hagen

See also 
 Association to Advance Collegiate Schools of Business
 European Quality Improvement System
 Accreditation, Certification, Quality Assurance Institute
 Association of MBAs
 Association to Advance Collegiate Schools of Business
 Triple accreditation

Notes and references

External links 
 Official Website

Higher education organisations based in Europe
School accreditors